Hashira-e (柱絵) or Pillar prints are Japanese woodblock prints usually measuring about 13cm x 73cm (4.5 in. by 28 in.).

They were originally intended to be hung upon, or pasted onto, wooden pillars inside Japanese houses. They probably served as cheap alternatives to hanging scrolls (kakemono) which were typically made of silk. Okumura Masanobu (1686–1764) is credited with popularizing this format of print. They were popular during the second half of the eighteenth century. Surviving examples are rare, and often faded, worn, or stained from exposure to soot and smoke.

Ukiyo-e artist Koryūsai (1735–1790) designed many hashira-e depicting a wide variety of subjects, particularly gods and beautiful women (bijin-ga).  The popularity of hashira format prints began to wane around 1800 and they were superseded by replaced by vertical diptychs of the larger Oban tate-e format – tate, meaning 'portrait', e meaning 'picture') the most frequent size for Japanese woodblock prints at approx. 24.4cm x 38cm (10 by 15 inches). Oban tate-e (and its landscape orientation Oban yoko-e) offered greater compositional freedom for artists of the nineteenth and the first half of the twentieth century.

Gallery

References

Further reading

Ukiyo-e genres